Alfred Ross Robert Martin Wiseman is a Canadian politician from Newfoundland and Labrador. Wiseman represented the district of Trinity North in the Newfoundland and Labrador House of Assembly from 2000 to 2015, as a member of the Progressive Conservative Party.

Wiseman served in the provincial cabinet as Minister of Finance, President of the Treasury Board, Minister of Environment and Conservation, Minister of Business and Minister of Health and Community Services. He also served as Speaker of the House of Assembly from 2011 to 2014. Prior to entering cabinet he was the Parliamentary Secretary to the Minister of Health and Community Services.

Politics
Wiseman was elected as the member of the House of Assembly (MHA) for the district of Trinity North on April 25, 2000. Originally elected as a member of the governing Liberal Party, Wiseman announced in September 2001 that he was crossing the floor to join the Progressive Conservative caucus.

Wiseman was appointed to cabinet in January 2007 as Minister of Health and Community Services. In a minor cabinet shuffle in 2009, he became Minister of Business. On January 13, 2011, Premier Kathy Dunderdale shuffled the cabinet, and Wiseman became Minister of Environment and Conservation.

Following his re-election in the October 2011, election Wiseman was uncontested for the role of Speaker of the House of Assembly.

On September 5, 2014, Wiseman was named Minister of Finance by outgoing premier Tom Marshall. He retained the portfolio when Paul Davis took over as premier later that month.

On July 30, 2015, Wiseman announced that he was leaving politics and would not run in the 2015 election.

Electoral record

|-

|-

|NDP
|Vanessa Wiseman
|align="right"|1,247
|align="right"|25.97
|align="right"|
|-

|}

|-

|-

|-

|NDP
|Janet Stringer
|align="right"|247
|align="right"|5.15
|align="right"|
|}

|-

|-

|-

|NDP
|Howard W. Duffett
|align="right"|340
|align="right"|5.56
|align="right"|
|}

|-

|-

|-

|NDP
|Perry  Feltham
|align="right"|398
|align="right"|7.21
|align="right"|
|}

References

1953 births
Living people
Finance ministers of Newfoundland and Labrador
Health ministers of Newfoundland and Labrador
Liberal Party of Newfoundland and Labrador MHAs
Progressive Conservative Party of Newfoundland and Labrador MHAs
Members of the Executive Council of Newfoundland and Labrador
Speakers of the Newfoundland and Labrador House of Assembly
21st-century Canadian politicians